Suzanne Jovet-Ast  (born 1914) was a French botanist, who worked principally at the National Museum of Natural History, France.

Life 
Suzanne Ast was born in Paris, France, on 8 February 1914. She received her Baccalauréat  (1932) from Lycée Voltaire (Paris) and obtained her doctorate (1943) while at the National Museum of Natural History. In 1939 she married the French botanist Paul Jovet.

Work 
She served as  Cryptogamy Chair of the National Museum of Natural History from 1975 to 1982. Together with Hélène Bischler-Causse she co-founded the Association des Amis des Cryptogames in 1975. In her early work she studied the flowering plant family Annonaceae, while the majority of her professional career was focused on Bryophytes. She retired in 1982.

Legacy 
She is the authority for at least 35 taxa using the name Ast including:  and 25 using the name Jovet-Ast including:

References 

20th-century French botanists
Bryologists
1914 births
2006 deaths
20th-century French women scientists
Scientists from Paris
French women botanists